Lower Silesian may refer to:
Lower Silesian language
Lower Silesian Voivodeship
Lower Silesia
Province of Lower Silesia